Albin Koponen (1 September 1881, Pielisjärvi – 10 November 1944) was a Finnish sheet metal worker and politician. He served as a Member of the Parliament of Finland from 1907 to 1918 and again from 1922 until his death in 1944, representing the Social Democratic Party of Finland (SDP). Koponen was imprisoned from 1918 to 1919 for having sided with the Reds during the Finnish Civil War.

References

1881 births
1944 deaths
People from Lieksa
People from Kuopio Province (Grand Duchy of Finland)
Social Democratic Party of Finland politicians
Members of the Parliament of Finland (1907–08)
Members of the Parliament of Finland (1908–09)
Members of the Parliament of Finland (1909–10)
Members of the Parliament of Finland (1910–11)
Members of the Parliament of Finland (1911–13)
Members of the Parliament of Finland (1913–16)
Members of the Parliament of Finland (1916–17)
Members of the Parliament of Finland (1917–19)
Members of the Parliament of Finland (1922–24)
Members of the Parliament of Finland (1924–27)
Members of the Parliament of Finland (1927–29)
Members of the Parliament of Finland (1929–30)
Members of the Parliament of Finland (1930–33)
Members of the Parliament of Finland (1933–36)
Members of the Parliament of Finland (1936–39)
Members of the Parliament of Finland (1939–45)
People of the Finnish Civil War (Red side)
Prisoners and detainees of Finland
Finnish people of World War II
Finnish prisoners and detainees